Harley D. Rutledge (January 10, 1926 – June 5, 2006) was a U.S. physics professor, and ufologist.

Early life and career 
In 1966, Rutledge completed his Ph.D. in solid state physics at the University of Missouri. He subsequently took the position of Professor and Chairman of the Physics Department at Southeast Missouri State University. He was Department Chairman from 1964 to 1982 and retired from teaching in 1992.

UFO Research 
Challenged to explain sightings of unidentified lights and luminous phenomena in the sky around Piedmont, Missouri, Rutledge decided to subject these reports to scientific analysis. He put together a team of observers with college training in the physical sciences, including a large array of equipment: RF spectrum analyzers, Questar telescopes, low-high frequency audio detectors, electromagnetic frequency analyzer, cameras, and a galvanometer to measure variations in the Earth's gravitational field.

The resulting Project Identification commenced in April 1973, logging several hundred hours of observation time. This was the first UFO scientific field study, able to monitor the phenomena in real-time, enabling Rutledge to calculate the objects' actual speed, course, position, distance, and size.

Observation of the unclouded night sky often revealed "pseudostars" - stationary lights camouflaged by familiar constellations. Some objects appeared to mimic the appearance of known aircraft; others violated the laws of physics. The most startling discovery was that on at least 32 recorded occasions, the movement of the lights synchronized with actions of the observers. They appeared to respond to a light being switched on and off, and to verbal or radio messages. The final results of this project were documented in the 1981 book, Project Identification: The first Scientific Study of UFO Phenomena.

Rutledge died on Monday, June 5, 2006 at the Missouri Veterans Home aged 80.

Books 
 Project Identification: The first Scientific Study of UFO Phenomena. Prentice-Hall 1981  by Harley D. Rutledge, Ph.D.

Research Papers 
Project Identification: Thirteen Years and One-Hundred and Sixty Sightings Later, Harley D. Rutledge, Ph.D. (presented at the 1986 MUFON symposium).

References

External links 
 Southeast Missouri State University physics faculty: Dr. Harley D. Rutledge

1926 births
2006 deaths
20th-century American physicists
Ufologists
University of Missouri alumni
Physicists from Missouri
Scientists from Missouri